Karl Clarence King (January 26, 1897 – April 16, 1974) was a Republican member of the U.S. House of Representatives from Pennsylvania.

Biography
Karl C. King was born in Plevna, Kansas. He attended the Kansas State Teachers College at Emporia, Kansas, Columbia University in New York City, and the Wharton School of Business.

During the First World War, King served in the United States Navy. He worked as a newspaper reporter in Kansas City, New York, and Philadelphia. He was engaged in farming and the farm supply business at Morrisville, Bucks County, Pennsylvania in 1922.

King was elected as a Republican to the 82nd Congress, by special election, November 6, 1951, to fill the vacancy caused by the death of Albert C. Vaughn. He was re-elected to the two succeeding Congresses, but was not a candidate for re-nomination in 1956. He authored his autobiography, titled Prairie Dogs and Postulates.

References
 Retrieved on 2008-02-10

1897 births
1974 deaths
People from Reno County, Kansas
United States Navy personnel of World War I
Columbia University alumni
People from Bucks County, Pennsylvania
Writers from Kansas
Writers from Pennsylvania
Republican Party members of the United States House of Representatives from Pennsylvania
20th-century American politicians
Wharton School of the University of Pennsylvania alumni
Emporia State University alumni